Mentor is a name used by several comics-related characters.

Marvel Comics
It is shared by two characters in Marvel Comics:

 Mentor (A'lars), the founder and leader of the Eternals
 Mentor (Imperial Guard), a member of the Shi'ar Imperial Guard

DC Comics
 Mentor, the guardian for Billy Batson (Captain Marvel) in the 1970s live action TV show Shazam! (TV series)

See also
 Mentor (disambiguation)